The Patient Rights (Scotland) Act 2011  is an Act of the Scottish Parliament.

The Act states that healthcare providers must consider the needs of patients, consider what would be the most beneficial to the patient, taking into account their circumstances and preferences and
encourage them to take part in decisions about their health and wellbeing, and provide them with information and support to do so.  It also established the treatment time guarantee which guarantees that certain groups of patients will start their treatment within 12 weeks of agreeing that treatment with the relevant NHS clinician.

Colin McIntyre from Glasgow was sent a letter guaranteeing his hip replacement within 12 weeks and that he would be offered an appointment before 16 February 2017. He subsequently got a phone call from the hospital telling him it would take eight or nine months. He took the view that the guarantee was "not worth the paper it is written on". He used his European Health Insurance Card to arrange his operation in France - within two weeks, and most of the cost was refunded by the health board.

It established the Patient Advice and Support Service.

References

Acts of the Scottish Parliament 2011